Detroit techno is a type of techno music that generally includes the first techno productions by Detroit-based artists during the 1980s and early 1990s. Prominent Detroit techno artists include Juan Atkins, Eddie Fowlkes, Derrick May, Jeff Mills, Kevin Saunderson, Blake Baxter, Drexciya, Mike Banks, Dakim Sadiq and Robert Hood.

The Belleville Three

The three individuals most closely associated with the birth of Detroit techno as a genre are Juan Atkins, Kevin Saunderson and Derrick May, also known as the "Belleville Three". The three, who were high school friends from Belleville, Michigan, created electronic music tracks in their basement(s). Derrick May once described Detroit techno music as being a "complete mistake ... like George Clinton and Kraftwerk caught in an elevator, with only a sequencer to keep them company."

While attending Washtenaw Community College, Atkins met Rick Davis and formed Cybotron with him. Their first single "Alleys of Your Mind", recorded on their Deep Space label in 1981, sold 15,000 copies, and the success of two follow-up singles, "Cosmic Cars" and "Clear", led the California-based label Fantasy to sign the duo and release their album, Clear. After Cybotron split due to creative differences, Atkins began recording as Model 500 on his own label, Metroplex, in 1985. His landmark single, "No UFO's", soon arrived. Eddie Fowlkes, Derrick May, Kevin Saunderson, and Robert Hood also recorded on Metroplex. May said that the suburban setting afforded a different setting in which to experience the music. "We perceived the music differently than you would if you encountered it in dance clubs. We'd sit back with the lights off and listen to records by Bootsy and Yellow Magic Orchestra. We never took it as just entertainment, we took it as a serious philosophy," recalls May.

The three teenage friends bonded while listening to an eclectic mix of music: Yellow Magic Orchestra, Kraftwerk, Bootsy, Parliament, Prince, Depeche Mode, and The B-52's. Juan Atkins was inspired to buy a synthesizer after hearing Parliament. Atkins was also the first in the group to take up turntablism, teaching May and Saunderson how to DJ.

Under the name Deep Space Soundworks, Atkins and May began to DJ on Detroit's party circuit. By 1981, Mojo was playing the record mixes recorded by the Belleville Three, who were also branching out to work with other musicians. The trio traveled to Chicago to investigate the house music scene there, particularly the Chicago DJs Ron Hardy and Frankie Knuckles. House was a natural progression from disco music, so that the trio began to formulate the synthesis of this dance music with the mechanical sounds of groups like Kraftwerk, in a way that reflected post-industrialist Detroit. An obsession with the future and its machines is reflected in much of their music, because, according to Atkins, Detroit is the most advanced in the transition away from industrialism.

Juan Atkins has been lauded as the "Godfather of Techno" while Derrick May is thought of as the "Innovator" and Kevin Saunderson is often referred to as the "Elevator"

In the early years of techno Erik Travis launched his label PC records releasing "Sound of mind" Programming in 1987, and Direct drive ep in 1988 with a more Kraftwerk influence in sound. Travis's roots dates back to 1985. The label would have a small success due to Travis solely taking on the project. While many artists were inspired by the release and played by DJs like Jeff Mills (The Wizard) and other Detroit DJs and is now considered as a hidden gem of techno. Travis would receive more popularity with the 1998 Metroplex release of Techno Drivers. His releases also include "In the Mind of Erik" in 1995, "Rolling Through Time" in 1997, "Many Voices of Travis" in 1999 and more for his label F.a.c.t. Records. He still continues to press currently on Othofact Records.

Futurism

These early Detroit techno artists employed science fiction imagery to articulate their visions of a transformed society. A notable exception to this trend was a single by Derrick May under his pseudonym  Is , called "Strings of Life" (1987). This vibrant dancefloor anthem was filled with rich synthetic string arrangements and took the underground music scene by storm in May 1987. It "hit Britain in an especially big way during the country's 1987–1988 house explosion." It became May's best known track, which, according to Frankie Knuckles, "just exploded. It was like something you can't imagine, the kind of power and energy people got off that record when it was first heard. "

The club scene created by techno in Detroit was a way for suburban blacks in Detroit to distance themselves from "jits", slang for lower class African Americans living in the inner city. "Prep parties" were obsessed with flaunting wealth and incorporated many aspects of European culture including club names like Plush, Charivari, and GQ Productions, reflecting European fashion and luxury, because Europe signified high class. In addition prep parties were run as private clubs and restricted who could enter based on dress and appearance. Party flyers were also an attempt to restrict and distance lower class individuals from the middle class club scene.

Afrofuturism
The three artists all contribute to the discourse of Afrofuturism through their re-purposing of technology to create a new form of music that appealed to a marginalized underground population. Especially within the context of Detroit, where the rise of robotics led to a massive loss of jobs around the time these three were growing up, technology is very relevant. The process "took technology, and made it a black secret."

The sound is both futuristic and extraterrestrial, touching on the "otherness" central to Afrofuturist content. According to one critic, it was a "deprived sound trying to get out." Tukufu Zuberi explains that electronic music can be multiracial and that critics should pay attention to "not just sound aesthetics but the production process and institutions created by black musicians."

The Music Institute
Inspired by Chicago's house clubs, Chez Damier, Alton Miller and George Baker started a club of their own in downtown Detroit, named The Music Institute at 1315 Broadway. The club helped unite a previously scattered scene into an underground "family", where May, Atkins, and Saunderson DJed with fellow pioneers like Eddie "Flashin" Fowlkes and Blake Baxter. It allowed for collaboration, and helped inspire what would become the second wave of Detroit-area techno, which included artists whom the Belleville Three had influenced and mentored.

Success abroad
In 1988, due to the popularity of house and acid house music in Great Britain, Virgin Records talent scout Neil Rushton contacted Derrick May with a view to finding out more about the Detroit scene. To define the Detroit sound as being distinct from Chicago house, Rushton and the Belleville Three chose the word "techno" for their tracks, a term that Atkins had been using since his Cybotron days ("Techno City" was an early single).

Recent work
Juan Atkins, Kevin Saunderson, and Derrick May remain active in the music scene today. In 2000, the first annual Detroit Electronic Music Festival was held, and in 2004 May assumed control of the festival, renamed Movement. He invested his own funds into the festival, and "got severely wounded financially." Kevin Saunderson helmed the festival, renamed FUSE IN, the following year. Saunderson, May, and Carl Craig all performed but did not produce the festival in 2006, when it was again called Movement. Saunderson returned to perform at the 2007 Movement as well.

Politics
The first wave of Detroit techno differed from the Chicago house movement, with the former originating in Detroit's suburban black middle class community. Teenagers of families that had prospered as a result of Detroit's automotive industry were removed from the kind of black poverty found in urban parts of Detroit, Chicago, and New York. This resulted in tensions in club spaces frequented by ghetto gangstas or ruffians where signs stating "No Jits" were common. Suburban middle class black youths were also attracted to Europhile culture, something that was criticized for not being authentically black. Schaub's analysis of Underground Resistance valued "speaking out of the perspective of the hood than about providing new visions of identity formation for people in the hood"

Identity politics in Detroit techno is focused mostly on race relations. Throughout the creation of techno there was this constant and strong "progressive desire to move beyond essentialized blackness". Even though the classist nature of techno avoided the artists and producers to separate themselves from the urban poor, especially in the first wave, it helped them make metropolitan spaces the subject of their own vision of different, alternative societies. These alternate societies aimed at moving beyond the concepts of race and ethnicity and blend all of them together. The early producers of Detroit techno state in multiple different occasions that the goal was to make techno just about music and not about race. As Juan Atkins said, "I hate that things have to be separated and dissected [by race] ... to me it shouldn't be white or black music, it should be just music"

The New Dance Sound of Detroit

The explosion of interest in electronic dance music during the late 1980s provided a context for the development of techno as an identifiable genre. The mid-1988 UK release of Techno! The New Dance Sound of Detroit, an album compiled by ex-Northern Soul DJ and Kool Kat Records boss Neil Rushton (at the time an A&R scout for Virgin's "10 Records" imprint) and Derrick May, was an important milestone and marked the introduction of the word techno in reference to a specific genre of music. Although the compilation put techno into the lexicon of British music journalism, the music was, for a time, sometimes characterized as Detroit's high-tech interpretation of Chicago house rather than a relatively pure genre unto itself. In fact, the compilation's working title had been The House Sound of Detroit until the addition of Atkins' song "Techno Music" prompted reconsideration. Rushton was later quoted as saying he, Atkins, May, and Saunderson came up with the compilation's final name together, and that the Belleville Three voted down calling the music some kind of regional brand of house; they instead favored a term they were already using, techno.

Second wave
The first wave of Detroit techno had peaked in 1988–89, with the popularity of artists like Derrick May, Kevin Saunderson, Blake Baxter, and Chez Damier, and clubs like St. Andrews Hall, Majestic Theater, The Shelter, and the Music Institute. At the same time, Detroit techno benefited from the growth of the European rave scene and various licensing deals with labels in the UK, including Kool Kat Records. By 1989 May's Strings of Life had achieved "anthemic" status. several years after its recording.

By the early 1990s a second wave of Detroit artists started to break through, including, among others, Carl Craig, Underground Resistance (featuring Mike Banks, Jeff Mills, and Robert Hood), Blake Baxter, Jay Denham, and Octave One. According to music journalist Simon Reynolds, in the same period what began as a Europhile fantasy of elegance and refinement was, ironically, transformed by British and European producers into a "vulgar uproar for E'd-up mobs: anthemic, cheesily sentimental, unabashedly drug-crazed." Detroit embraced this maximalism and created its own variant of acid house and techno. The result was a harsh Detroit hardcore full of riffs and industrial bleakness. Two major labels of this sound were Underground Resistance and +8, both of which mixed 1980s electro, UK synth-pop and industrial paralleling the brutalism of rave music of Europe.

Underground Resistance's music embodied a kind of abstract militancy by presenting themselves as a paramilitary group fighting against commercial mainstream entertainment industry who they called "the programmers" in their tracks such as Predator, Elimination, Riot or Death Star. Similarly, the label +8 was formed by Richie Hawtin and John Acquaviva which evolved from industrial hardcore to a minimalist progressive techno sound. As friendly rivals to Underground Resistance, +8 pushed up the speed of their songs faster and fiercer in tracks like Vortex.

On Memorial Day weekend of 2000, electronic music fans from around the globe made a pilgrimage to Hart Plaza on the banks of the Detroit River and experienced the first Detroit Electronic Music Festival. In 2003, the festival management changed the name to Movement, then Fuse-In (2005), and most recently, Movement: Detroit's Electronic Music Festival (2007). The festival is a showcase for DJs and performers across all genres of electronic music, takes course over a period of three days, and is considered to be the best underground electronic music festival in the United States. There are also many events outside of the festival, including the largest afterparties at the Detroit Masonic Temple and another popular party at The Old Miami with a surprise line-up.

Notable Detroit area record labels

430 West Records
Detroit Techno Militia
Axis Records
Fragile
Metroplex
Minus Records
Planet E Communications
Plus 8
Transmat
Underground Resistance

Other notable Detroit techno styled producers and acts

Aril Brikha
Surgeon (musician)
Fabrice Lig
Kelli Hand

See also

 Detroit Electronic Music Festival (DEMF)
 Music of Detroit, Michigan

Bibliography
 Brewster B. & Broughton F., Last Night a DJ Saved My Life: The History of the Disc Jockey, Avalon Travel Publishing, 2006,.
 Reynolds, S., Energy Flash: a Journey Through Rave Music and Dance Culture, Pan Macmillan, 1998.
 Reynolds, S., Generation Ecstasy: Into the World of Techno and Rave Culture, Routledge, New York 1999.

References

 
1980s in Detroit
Techno genres
Music of Detroit
Music scenes
African-American music